Herald of Freedom may refer to:

 Herald of Freedom (Boston newspaper) (1788–1791)
 The Herald of Freedom, a newspaper published by P. T. Barnum in Bethel, Connecticut (1829)
 Herald of Freedom (Lawrence newspaper), published in Wakarusa then Lawrence, Kansas, during the Bleeding Kansas period (1854–1860)
 Herald of Freedom (journal), the journal of the New Hampshire Anti-Slavery Society, published by John R. French
 "Herald of Freedom" (essay), an 1884 essay about the journal by Henry David Thoreau
 Herald of Freedom, a mid-20th century right-wing newsletter by Francis Alphonse Capell